Lajos Papp (8 April 1944 – 31 October 1993) was a Hungarian sport shooter who won a bronze medal in the 300 m free rifle event at the 1972 Summer Olympics in Munich.

References

1944 births
1993 deaths
Hungarian male sport shooters
Olympic shooters of Hungary
Shooters at the 1968 Summer Olympics
Shooters at the 1972 Summer Olympics
Shooters at the 1976 Summer Olympics
Olympic bronze medalists for Hungary
Olympic medalists in shooting
Medalists at the 1972 Summer Olympics
Sportspeople from Debrecen
20th-century Hungarian people